Janet Elizabeth Burston (January 11, 1935 – March 3, 1998) was an American child actress who was the final leading lady in the Our Gang short subjects series, replacing Darla Hood in 1942.

Career
Burston began her film career in the Our Gang film All About Hash as a background child character in 1940 at age five. Burston stayed as a background character for two years before replacing Darla Hood as leading lady in 1941. She stayed with the gang until the end of the series in 1944. She appeared in a few outside films as well, leaving show business in 1964, eventually becoming a housewife.

Janet Burston married four times during her lifetime. After her retirement from acting, she kept a low profile and attended few Our Gang reunions.

Death
Burston died in her sleep on March 3, 1998. She was 63.

Our Gang filmography
All About Hash (1940)
Waldo's Last Stand (1940)
Baby Blues (1941)
Melodies Old and New (1942)
Surprised Parties (1942)
Doin' Their Bit (1942)
Rover's Big Chance (1942)
Benjamin Franklin, Jr. (1943)
Family Troubles (1943)
Calling All Kids (1943)
Election Daze (1943)
Little Miss Pinkerton (1943)
Three Smart Guys (1943)
Radio Bugs (1944)
Tale of a Dog (1944)
Dancing Romeo (1944)

External links
 
 
 Meeting Janet Burston in 1995

Deaths from cancer in California
1935 births
1998 deaths
American film actresses
20th-century American actresses
Our Gang